Athletics competitions at the 1981 South Pacific Mini Games were held in Honiara, Solomon Islands, between July 8–16, 1981.

A total of 36 events were contested, 22 by men and 14 by women.

Medal summary
Medal winners and their results were published on the Athletics Weekly webpage
courtesy of Tony Isaacs and Børre Lilloe, and on the Oceania Athletics Association webpage by Bob Snow.

Complete results can also be found on the Oceania Athletics Association, and on the Athletics PNG webpages.

Men

Women

Medal table (unofficial)

Participation (unofficial)
Athletes from the following 14 countries were reported to participate:

References

External links
Pacific Games Council
Oceania Athletics Association

Athletics at the Pacific Mini Games
Athletics in the Solomon Islands
South Pacific Mini Games
1981 in Solomon Islands sport
1981 Pacific Games